The Castilla y León Cup 2009–10 (Spanish: Copa Castilla y León 2009–10) is the first edition of this football trophy in its renewed version  after the regional championships celebrated between 1925 and 1931 and the 1985 summer trophy.

Teams participants

 Real Valladolid (started at the semi-finals)
 Numancia
 UD Salamanca
 Cultural Leonesa
 Ponferradina
 Zamora
 Guijuelo
 Palencia
 Mirandés
 Burgos
 Arandina
 Atlético Bembibre
 Real Ávila (withdrew by financial problems)
 Gimnástica Segoviana (withdrew by financial problems)

Financial problems

The economic situation of Real Ávila and Gimnástica Segoviana provoked their withdrew of the tournament in July. To refill again the tournament, Castilla y León Football Federation called Atlético Bembibre. The tournament has, at the end, twelve clubs, eleven of which took part in the group stage.

Group stage

All times are CEST

Group A

Group B

Group C

Final phase

Draw

Semi-finals

Final

References

Castilla y León Cup
2009–10 in Spanish football cups